Kmetija Slavnih ("Farm of Celebrities") was the third season of the Slovene reality show Kmetija ("Farm") based on Swedish franchise Farmen produced by Strix. The show launched on September 28, 2009, with introducing of 10 celebrities who will compete for a grand prize 50,000 EUR. Letter in the series 4 new contestants enter the farm. The show ended on December 7, 2009, with Goran Breščanski won over Artur Štern in Live Finale.

Cast
Presenter of The Farm was Anja Križnik Tomažin. Master of the farm was in first week Marijan Podobnik, who also appeared in the first two seasons. However he died in the second week of the show; his replacement was Vencelj Tušar who appeared from week 3 until the end.

A grand prize
A top prize was a twist in this season. From the very beginning was a prize money €0. But this prize could increase through the season. Each week contestants will be given a task. The prize for each passed task is 50 sequins. But if task is incomplete the prize could be lower or even 0 sequins. Every week head of household could go on farmers market. On farmers market the HOH could buy goods for the family with earned sequins. On farmers market are three stalls: 
 Osnovne dobrine (Eng.: Basic goods)
 Priboljški (Eng.: Goodies)
 Luksus (Eng.: Luxuries)
On any of these stalls each product has own price. On first stall every product cost 1 sequin, on second two sequins and on third three sequins. Sequins that remain in final week are transmitted to real money by rate 1 sequin ... 100 euro. With 363 sequins remaining the winner Goran Breščanski won €36,300.

Alliance of final 4
Final 4 contestants: Goran, Artur, Marijan and Maja P made an alliance in very first week. The goal of alliance was to make it to final 4 and split a grand prize among them. Alliance was created by Artur, HOH at the time in week 1. This alliance soon collapses but was reformed in final weeks. Marijan member of the alliance decided not to be part of alliance any more on the final night after has watched the season. So grand prize was split between just three of them; Artur, Marijan and Maja Prašnikar. Although Marijan won public prize; €13,700.

Broadcasting
Farm of celebrities is broadcast by POP TV six nights a week.

On Tuesday, Wednesday, Thursday, Friday and Saturday, daily highlights from the farm are broadcast at 8 pm local time (Central European Time zone). These daily episodes run least 60 min including commercial breaks. In Monday's episode housemates read the eliminated contestant's letter in which he wrote who he determined to be the new HOH. In Tuesday's episode the HOH determines two servants (male and female). In the Friday episode contestants decide which of two servants should be first duelist. In Saturday's episode first duelist chose second duelist, they both move to isolated houses. Second duelist should choose which of three types of duels will be played. Three types are: Rope, Saw or Knowledge. If duelists are different genders the only possible duel is knowledge. At the end of episode the duel is played and loser of the duel is eliminated.

Once a week there is an on-air live episode. It is aired Monday at 9 pm CET. The show lasts 120 min including commercials. The show is presented by Anja Križnik Tomažin with three commentators; Goran Lean (contestant on second season of Kmetija), Angelca Likovič (retired Head teacher of primary school, mostly known by being a primary school teacher of previous Slovene prime minister Janez Janša), and Mark Žitnik (Slovene producer). A special guest is this week's eliminated contestant.

Live Launch is first episode of the series. In this episode are presented 10 celebrities that will be a contestants on the show. Unlike many other series contestants do not enter the farm in this episode, but in the first daily episode.

Live Finale final and ultimate episode of Kmetija Slavnih is the live finale. Two finalists are competing for a grand prize. In this episode all eliminated contestants guests are on the show. The winner should win at least two of three duels. Each type of duel is played once.

The audience is also offered 24 hours Internet feed on the web page. Unlike other programs such as Big Brother the live feed on Kmetija Slavnih is free.

Contestants

Nominations

The Farm (franchise)
2009 Slovenian television seasons